This is a list of streets renamed due to the 2022 Russian invasion of Ukraine. Following the invasion, One Philosophy consulting group together with Ukrainian Ministry of Foreign Affairs launched a campaign called "Ukraine Street", which calls for nations to change the name of the streets where the Russian embassy or consulate is located on to "Ukraine Street". Foreign Minister Dmytro Kuleba called the campaign part of an effort to "isolate Russia and de-Putinize the world." In addition, Ukraine has been conducting a campaign of Derussification, removing names of streets and plazas associated with Russian and Soviet history and replacing them with Ukrainian names.

History
Malta has rejected the request to rename streets. The spokesperson of the local council of San Ġwann, Malta, where the Russian embassy is located, refused attempts of renaming as it would force residents of the street to change their addresses.

The naming committee of Stockholm Municipality, Sweden, opposed calls to rename the street outside the Russian embassy "Zelensky-gatan" (Zelensky Street). Its chairperson Olle Zetterberg cited the fact that Stockholm streets are usually not named after a living person, and that there is no "good reason" to reject the current name.

The Netherlands stated that it would cost too much, and would cost much hassle and objections. In Zaandam, in the Netherlands, some citizens changed some street names by themselves by adding stickers on street signs but were removed. The same happened in a street in Prague, in the Czech Republic.

As a consequence of support to Ukraine from various countries, streets have also been renamed in Ukraine in their honor.

List

See also
 List of Ukrainian toponyms that were changed as part of decommunization in 2016
 List of renamed cities in Ukraine
 List of politically motivated renamings
 List of street names changed around diplomatic mission buildings for political reasons
 Derussification in Ukraine

References

External links
 Ukraine Street official website

2022
Street renaming
Reactions to the 2022 Russian invasion of Ukraine
Derussification
Events affected by the 2022 Russian invasion of Ukraine